Kyakhulay (Käxulay-Torqali) is an urban locality (an urban-type settlement) under the administrative jurisdiction of Sovetsky City District of the City of Makhachkala in the Republic of Dagestan, Russia. As of the 2010 Census, its population was 6,962.

History
Urban-type settlement status was granted to Kyakhulay in 1992.

Administrative and municipal status
Within the framework of administrative divisions, the urban-type settlement of Kyakhulay is in jurisdiction of Sovetsky City District of the City of Makhachkala. Within the framework of municipal divisions, Kyakhulay is a part of Makhachkala Urban Okrug.

References

Notes

Sources

Urban-type settlements in the Republic of Dagestan